Brunstock is a hamlet in the civil parish of Stanwix Rural, in the Carlisle district, in the county of Cumbria, England. Circa 1870, the township had a population of 84 as recorded in the Imperial Gazetteer of England and Wales.

History 
The name "Brunstock" may mean 'Brun's farmstead", 'Brun's field-path', 'Brun's boundary-post', 'the farm by the burn', 'the field path by the burn' or 'the post by the burn'. Brunstock was "Brumescheyd" in 1124, "Brunescayd" in 1240, "Brunschaith" in 1250, "Bruneskayth" in 1253, "Brunscaith" in 1276, "Brunestach" in 1281, "Brunskeyt", "Brumskeyt" and "Brumschayt" in 1292, "Brunskayth" and "Brunschath" in 1318, "Brunskaith" in 1332, "Brunscayth" in 1345, "Burnscath" in 1422, "litillburnscath'" in 1424, "Bronnsketh" or "Bronsketh" in 1498, "Brunskath" in 1509, "Bronsketh mylne" in 1563, "Bronskewgh" in 1564, "Bruscath flu" in 1576, "Brunscathhead" in 1603, "Brunskathe Becke" and "Brunskaythe Beck" in 1609, "Brunskugh Beck" and "Brunskeugh Beck" in 1610, "Brunstock" in 1662, "Brunstock" or "Brunskeugh" in 1687, "Brim Stock" in 1710, "Brinstock" in 1714.

Location 
It is a few miles away from the small city of Carlisle and near the River Eden, there is also Brunstock Beck nearby.

Nearby settlements 
Nearby settlements include the city of Carlisle, the commuter village of Houghton, the hamlets of Linstock, Whiteclosegate, Tarraby and Park Broom.

Transport 
For transport there is the A689 road about an eighth of a mile away and the B6264 and M6 motorway nearby. There is also the Carlisle railway station a few miles away, which is on the Settle-Carlisle Line.

See also

Listed buildings in Stanwix Rural

References 

 http://www.a-zmaps.co.uk/?nid=60&iid=3579&pts=1,2,3,4,5,6,&s=Carlisle&t=4957&st=1

Hamlets in Cumbria
City of Carlisle